Antennophorina is a suborder of mites in the order Mesostigmata. There are at least 4 families and more than 20 described species in Antennophorina.

Families
These four families belong to the suborder Antennophorina:
 Antennophoridae
 Diplogyniidae
 Euzerconidae
 Megisthanidae

References

Further reading

External links

 

Mesostigmata